The 2000 Altodigital.com Premier League was a  professional non-ranking snooker tournament that was played from 8 January to 6 May 2000.

Stephen Hendry won in the final 9–5 against Mark Williams.

Hendry made his 500th career century in his match against Ronnie O'Sullivan at Stirling on 2 April.


League phase

Top four qualified for the play-offs. If points were level then most frames won determined their positions. If two players had an identical record then the result in their match determined their positions. If that ended 4–4 then the player who got to four first was higher.

 8 January – Swansea Leisure Centre, Swansea, Wales
 Mark Williams 5–3 Steve Davis
 John Higgins 6–2 Jimmy White
 9 January – Swansea Leisure Centre, Swansea, Wales
 John Higgins 5–3 Steve Davis
 Ronnie O'Sullivan 4–4 Jimmy White
 Stephen Hendry 4–4 Mark Williams
 5 February – North Kesteven Leisure Centre, Lincoln, England
 Stephen Hendry 7–1 Marco Fu
 Ronnie O'Sullivan 4–4 Marco Fu
 Steve Davis 4–4 Jimmy White
 6 February – North Kesteven Leisure Centre, Lincoln, England
 John Higgins 5–3 Mark Williams
 Ronnie O'Sullivan 5–3 John Higgins
 Stephen Hendry 5–3 Steve Davis
 18 March – Cleethorpes Leisure Centre, Cleethorpes, England
 Mark Williams 4–4 Ronnie O'Sullivan
 Stephen Hendry 5–3 Jimmy White
 19 March – Cleethorpes Leisure Centre, Cleethorpes, England
 Marco Fu 5–3 John Higgins
 Ronnie O'Sullivan 7–1 Steve Davis
 Marco Fu 5–3 Jimmy White
 1 April – University of Stirling, Stirling, Scotland
 Mark Williams 5–3 Marco Fu
 John Higgins 5–3 Stephen Hendry
 2 April – University of Stirling, Stirling, Scotland
 Marco Fu 6–2 Steve Davis
 Mark Williams 6–2 Jimmy White
 Stephen Hendry 6–2 Ronnie O'Sullivan

Play-offs 
5–6 May – Charter Hall, Colchester, England

References

2000
Premier League
Premier League Snooker